The Governor of San Cristóbal is the civil representative of the President of the Republic in San Cristóbal Province, who designated it.

From its creation until the fall of the Trujillo dictatorship the title of the Governor was Governor of Trujillo Province. During a period of time, the Governor was elevated to the category of Secretary of State (Minister) and was titled as Secretary of State, Governor of Trujillo Province.

The Article 198 of the Constitution of the 2010 said the requirements to be governor:
 Be Dominican.
 Be older than 25 years.
 Have full use of civil and political rights.

The governor's attribution and duties are determined by law.

The current governor is Pura Castilla.

List of San Cristóbal governors
The follow list is incomplete.

References

Government of the Dominican Republic
San Cristóbal Province